is a junction passenger railway station  located in the city of Kawanishi, Hyōgo Prefecture, Japan. It is operated by the private transportation company Nose Electric Railway.

Lines

Station layout
The station consists of one "V"-shaped central island platform with a side platform on both sides. The station has three floors, with ticket gates on the first floor, a transfer concourse on the second floor, and the island platform on the third floor.
Elevators are installed on all platforms, but only the elevators on the center platforms of tracks 2 and 3 directly connect the ticket gates on the 1st floor, and passengers on the side platforms much change elevators or use the stairs.

Platforms

Adjacent stations

History
Yamashita Station opened on November 3, 1923.

Passenger statistics
In fiscal 2019, the station was used by an average of 6,474 passengers daily

Surrounding area
Kawanishi City Folk Museum
Kawanishi City Azumaya Public Hall
Kawanishi Municipal East Housing Complex
Kawanishi Municipal Kawanishi Hospital

See also
List of railway stations in Japan

References

External links 

 Yamashita Station official home page 

Railway stations in Hyōgo Prefecture
Stations of Nose Electric Railway
Railway stations in Japan opened in 1923
Kawanishi, Hyōgo